Pete Agnew (born 14 September 1946) is a Scottish bassist and backing vocalist for the hard rock band Nazareth. Born in Dunfermline, he is the sole continuous member who still is performing with the band, which released its first album Nazareth in 1971, and the last founding member who remains alive.

Agnew formed a rock combo called the Shadettes in 1961, performing for eight years as the band's rhythm guitarist. In 1969 the band needed a new bassist. He once quipped, "I never even wanted to play the bass (laughter). The only reason why I started playing the bass was because there was nobody in Dunfermline who could do it (laughter)." The band became known as Nazareth in 1970.

He is the last surviving member of the best-known lineup of Nazareth, predeceased by vocalist Dan McCafferty, guitarist Manny Charlton, and drummer Darrell Sweet.

Agnew is the father of Lee Agnew, drummer for Nazareth since the death of Darrell Sweet who died in 1999. Two other sons, Stevie and Chris, are musicians.

References

1946 births
Living people
Scottish heavy metal bass guitarists
Scottish bass guitarists
People from Dunfermline
Nazareth (band) members
Blues rock musicians